The chapters of the Japanese manga series Gintama are written and illustrated by Hideaki Sorachi. They have been serialized for the shōnen manga anthology book Weekly Shōnen Jump from Shueisha since December 8, 2003. It is set in an Edo which has been conquered by aliens named Amanto. The plot follows the life from the samurai Gintoki Sakata who works as a free-lancer along his friends, Shinpachi Shimura and Kagura, in order to pay the monthly rent from where he lives.

Over seven-hundred chapters identified as a "Lesson" have been serialized. Viz Media licensed Gintama for publication in North America. A 55-page preview from the series was first featured in the January 2006 Shonen Jump issue. Viz acquired the license to publish chapters from the series in the Shonen Jump during the San Diego Comic-Con International from 2006. The chapters were serialized in Shonen Jump from January to May 2007 at a rate of one chapter a month. Shueisha is also publishing the first chapters of Gintama online on their Weekly Shōnen Jump official website. On April 4, 2006, an anime adaptation from the series, developed by Sunrise and directed initially by Shinji Takamatsu and later by Yoichi Fujita, premiered on TV Tokyo.

Shueisha collected the chapters in tankōbon volumes with the first being published on April 2, 2004. Seventy seven volumes have been released in Japan. In North America tankōbon were published in under Viz's "Shonen Jump Advanced" imprint. The first volume was published on July 3, 2007, and publication ended with the twenty-third on August 2, 2011.

Volume list

Volumes 1–20

Volumes 21–40

Volumes 41–60

Volumes 61–77

References

External links
 Official Gintama manga website 

Gintama
Gintama